Prunts may be:
 the plural of prunt
 the Kashmiri name of the city of Poonch and the respective district